Sailing was added to the 2000 Sydney Games.

Daniel Fitzgibbon and Graeme Martin have won two medals at two Games.

Medalists

Summer Paralympic Games

2000

2004
No medals.

2008

2012

See also
Australian Paralympic Sailing Team

References 

Paralympic sailors of Australia
Sailing